Sandy Hook is a village in the town of Newtown, Connecticut. It was founded in 1711. It was listed as a census-designated place prior to the 2020 census.

Sandy Hook borders the village of Botsford, the Newtown borough, and the towns of Monroe, Southbury, and Oxford along the Housatonic River. The village of Sandy Hook includes the communities of Berkshire, Riverside, Walnut Tree Hill, and Zoar. It also extends for a short distance into the town of Monroe along Old Zoar Road and Bagburn Hill/Jordan Hill Road.

History
Sandy Hook was founded when several proprietors with land in the area relocated together to reduce isolation. Within a year of the settlement of Newtown, some of its proprietors began moving away from the central village to some of their larger parcels. Colonists found that the Pootatuck River at Sandy Hook allowed for saw and grist mills, leading to it becoming one of the first outlying areas to be settled. The neighborhood did not grow dramatically until the mid-19th century post-industrialization.

2012 school shooting

, Adam Lanza shot and killed his mother at home, then went to Sandy Hook Elementary School where he killed 26 people including 20 children. He committed suicide when police arrived to the school. It was the  mass shooting in U.S. history at the time, after the 2007 Virginia Tech shootings.

Landmarks
Sandy Hook has a few historic landmarks on the National Register of Historic Places.

 Nathan B. Lattin Farm
 New York Belting and Packing Co.
 Sanford–Curtis–Thurber House

Notable residents

John Angel, sculptor
Luther Meade Blackman, major during the American Civil War accused of forging the Bat Creek inscription
Suzanne Collins, American television writer and author of The Underland Chronicles and The Hunger Games trilogy
Anthony Edwards, actor
William Hamilton Gibson, 19th-century illustrator, author, and naturalist
Charles Goodyear, gained renown in 1839 for the technique of the vulcanization of rubber
Ruth Gordon, actress
Arthur Twining Hadley, 13th president of Yale University
John Howat, curator at the Metropolitan Museum of Art
Charles R. Jackson, 1950s writer and novelist, author of The Lost Weekend
Caitlyn Jenner, 1976 Summer Olympics decathlon gold medalist
Elia Kazan, stage/motion picture director and author
Steven Kellogg, illustrator
Grace Moore, operatic soprano and actress in musical theater and film
Valentin Panera, Spanish actor, husband of Grace Moore
Molly Pearson, 20th-century stage actress
Albert Berger Rossdale, U.S. Representative from New York
James Thurber, writer, satirist, cartoonist, author of The Secret Life of Walter Mitty
Marcus Tracy, professional soccer player
Mead Treadwell, 13th Lieutenant Governor of Alaska and former chair of the U.S. Arctic Research Commission
Jenna von Oÿ, actress and singer
Thelma Wood, sculptor
Wally Cox, Actor
Antonio Fargas, Actor
Max Nacewicz, Professional Football Player

References

Newtown, Connecticut
Villages in Connecticut
Villages in Fairfield County, Connecticut
1711 establishments in Connecticut
Populated places established in 1711
Census-designated places in Fairfield County, Connecticut
Census-designated places in Connecticut